D (D-sharp) or re dièse is the fourth semitone of the solfège.
It lies a chromatic semitone above D and a diatonic semitone below E, thus being enharmonic to mi bémol or E. However, in some temperaments, it is not the same as E.  E is a perfect fourth above B, whereas D is a major third above B.

When calculated in equal temperament with a reference of A above middle C as 440 Hz, the frequency of the D above middle C (or D4) is approximately 311.127 Hz. See pitch (music) for a discussion of historical variations in frequency.

Designation by octave

Scales

Common scales beginning on D
 D major: D E F G A B C D
 D natural minor: D E F G A B C D
 D harmonic minor: D E F G A B C D
 D melodic minor ascending: D E F G A B C D
 D Melodic Minor Descending: D C B A G F E D

Diatonic scales
 D Ionian: D E F G A B C D
 D Dorian: D E F G A B C D
 D Phrygian: D E F G A B C D
 D Lydian: D E F G A B C D
 D Mixolydian: D E F G A B C D
 D Aeolian: D E F G A B C D
 D Locrian: D E F G A B C D

Alternate Scales
 D Dorian ♭2: D E F G A B C D
 D Lydian augmented: D E F G A B C D
 D Lydian dominant: D E F G A B C D
 D Mixolydian ♭6: D E F G A B C D
 D Locrian ♮2: D E F G A B C D
 D altered: D E F G A B C D

See also
 Piano key frequencies
 D-sharp minor
 D-sharp major

Musical notes

fr:Ré (note de musique)